The 1981–82 season was the 36th season in Rijeka’s history and their 20th season in the Yugoslav First League. Their 7th place finish in the 1980–81 season meant it was their eighth successive season playing in the Yugoslav First League.

Competitions

Yugoslav First League

Classification

Results summary

Results by round

Matches

First League

Source: rsssf.com

Yugoslav Cup

Source: rsssf.com

Squad statistics
Competitive matches only.  Appearances in brackets indicate numbers of times the player came on as a substitute.

See also
1981–82 Yugoslav First League
1981–82 Yugoslav Cup

References

External links
 1981–82 Yugoslav First League at rsssf.com
 Prvenstvo 1981.-82. at nk-rijeka.hr

HNK Rijeka seasons
Rijeka